Aung Myat is the Burmese politician and incumbent Deputy Speaker of Shan State Hluttaw. He previously served as Chief Minister of Shan State. Aung Myat is an ethnic Danu.

Career
He is a retired Lieutenant-Colonel in the Myanmar Army, having graduated from the Defense Services Academy with a Bachelor of Science degree. A member of the Union Solidarity and Development Party, he was elected to represent Pindaya Township Constituency No. 1 as a Shan State Hluttaw representative in the 2010 Burmese general election.

Personal life
Aung Myat was born on 14 April 1963 to Nyunt Aung and Khin Kyi, in Pwela, Pindaya Township, Burma. Aung Myat is married to Phyu Phyu Nyunt and has 2 daughters and 1 son; Su Myat Phyu, Aye Myat Phyu, and Htet Myat Aung.

References

Government ministers of Myanmar
Union Solidarity and Development Party politicians
Living people
1963 births
People from Shan State
Burmese military personnel
Defence Services Academy alumni